Sattapadi Kutram is a 2011 Indian Tamil action drama film directed by S. A. Chandrasekhar starring Sathyaraj, Vikranth, Harish Kalyan. Bhanu, Komal Sharma, and Aishwarya Rajesh are the female leads, and A. Venkatesh, Suresh, and Radha Ravi play supporting roles. The film dealt with various issues, including corruption in the higher echelons of the government, stashing of black money abroad by Indians, corruption in the Directorate of Vigilance and Anti-Corruption, sexual exploits of godmen, travails of Indian fishermen and the Sri Lankan ethnic conflict. Released on 25 March 2011 to negative reviews, it did poorly at the box-office.

Plot
The film revolves around a man named Subash Chandrabose (Sathyaraj), whose life has been torn to shreds by corrupt men of the system. He faced the brunt of their anger when he dared to stand up against them. Now, his sole aim is to purge the system and the country of all corrupt evils. For that, he begins forging a small army of young people who are at a similar angst against the system or at least some people in it. How this army goes about in its task of cleansing the political and bureaucratic scenario forms the rest of Sattapadi Kuttram.

Cast

 Sathyaraj as Subash Chandrabose
 Vikranth as Thangaraj
 Harish Kalyan as Surya
 Bhanu as Poorani
 Komal Sharma as Thamizharasi
 Aishwarya as Sumathi
 A. Venkatesh as Ekambaram
 Suresh as Annamalai
 Radha Ravi as Rathnavelu
 T. P. Gajendran as Jambulingam
 Livingston as Santhana Swamy
 Seeman as a lawyer
 Ajay Rathnam as Police officer
 Alex as Politician
 Crane Manohar

Soundtrack 
The soundtrack was composed by Vijay Antony. Vijay later re-used the film's song Yededho in his 2016 action thriller Saithan.

Critical reception
The New Indian Express wrote that "Appalling and ridiculous, these scenes only generate a lot of unintended humour." Rohit Ramachandran of nowrunning.com gave it 2/5 stars stating that "Realism is Sattapadi Kuttram's least concern. Its main concern is entertainment factor. It doesn't qualify as a good film but it manages to hold your interest." Behindwoods.com gave 1 on 5 and stated that the film was "Scathing political statement" and "The choice is whether you want to watch a reel account of all those scams and scandals being performed by actors when the real deal is being shown 24X7 on news channels. Make up your mind!".

References

External links
 
Sattapadi Kutram at Jointscene
Sattapadi Kutram at 600024.com

2011 films
Indian action films
2010s Tamil-language films
Films scored by Vijay Antony
Indian vigilante films
Films directed by S. A. Chandrasekhar
2011 action films
2010s vigilante films